Disney Channel is a British-managed Bulgarian pay television kids' channel, owned and operated by The Walt Disney Company Limited. It was launched on 19 September 2009, replacing Jetix Eastern Europe.

History
The channel was launched in April 1999 as Fox Kids Central and Eastern Europe, following the 1996 launch of Fox Kids UK. The network's programming consisted mostly of older shows from Fox Children's Productions, which were aired in the US Fox Kids block, and shows from its co-owners, Saban International. Saban also supplied the channel with the series from the Marvel animated universe. Most Bulgarian operators made it available in 1999, often with Russian audio. Later, they mostly switched to the English track.

In 2000, Bulgarian free-to-air television channel bTV, then owned by News Corporation, launched a Fox Kids-branded block which aired on weekday afternoons and weekend mornings. In 2004 the Fox Kids block was renamed to Jetix. It was removed in 2008, although bTV still airs shows from Jetix, but not part of any block.

In 2001, The Walt Disney Company announced its intention to buy Fox Kids' majority owner, Fox Family Worldwide, along with Haim Saban's entertainment companies, which in turn partly owned Fox Family. In 2004, Fox Kids Europe, Fox Kids Latin America and Disney announced to brand all their channels under one brand, titled Jetix. Jetix began as a block on Fox Kids and would eventually rebrand on 1 January 2005.

After Robert Iger became Disney's new chief executive officer, the company started to rename some of its properties in order to focus more on its key brands like Disney and ABC. Disney announced in December 2008 to fully purchase Jetix Europe and have it delisted from the Euronext. Most Jetix channels were changed over to Disney XD, but on 26 May 2009, Disney announced that the Jetix channel in certain countries (namely Hungary, Romania, the Czech Republic, Slovakia and Bulgaria) would be renamed to Disney Channel instead, marking that channel's first introduction in these countries. The channel finally rebranded to Disney Channel on 19 September 2009.

On 1 June 2011, the channel was rebranded to the American graphical package, with the app logo. On 21 July 2014 the channel was rebranded with the German graphical package. On 11 August 2015 Disney Channel Eastern Europe changed its aspect ratio from 4:3 to 16:9.

Programming
{| class="wikitable"
|-
! Series
! Bulgarian title 
! Dubbing studio
|-
| align="center" colspan=3 | Current programming
|-
| The Lion Guard
| Пазител на лъвските земи
|
|-
| Soy Luna
| Луна 
|
|- 
| Violetta
| Виолета
| Dolly Media Studio  (lip sync)
|-
| Phineas and Ferb
| Финиъс и Фърб
| Dolly Media Studio  (lip sync)(Formally voice-over for Season 1, only in 2020, they fully-dubbed Season 1 due to Disney+ existence)
|-
| Gravity Falls
| Тайните на Гравити Фолс
| N/A
|-
| Jessie
| Джеси
| Dolly Media Studio (lip sync)
|-
| Dog With a Blog
| Куче с блог
| Dolly Media Studio (lip sync)
|-
| Austin & Ally
| Остин и Али
| Dolly Media Studio (lip sync)
|-
| Liv and Maddie
| Лив и Мади
| Dolly Media Studio (lip sync)
|-
| Girl Meets World
| Райли в големия свят
| Alexandra Audio (lip sync)
|-
| Lab Rats
| Клонинги в мазето 
| Alexandra Audio (lip sync)
|-
| Crash & Bernstein
| Краш и Бърнстиин
| Alexandra Audio (lip sync)
|-
| I Didn't Do It
| Не бях аз
| Alexandra Audio (lip sync)
|-
| Mighty Med
| Доктори на супергерои 
| Alexandra Audio (lip sync)
|-
| Wolfblood
| Улф Блъд 
| Alexandra Audio (lip sync)
|-
| The 7D
| 7 д
| Alexandra Audio (lip sync)
|-
| Sabrina: Secrets of a Teenage Witch 
| Сабрина: Тайната на една вещица
| Alexandra Audio (lip sync)
|-
| Good Luck Charlie
| Късмет, Чарли
| Dolly Media Studio (lip sync)
|-
| The ZhuZhus
| Зу Зу
| Alexandra Audio
|-
| Raven’s Home
| Домът на гарвана
| Alexandra Audio (lip sync)
|-
| GhostForce
| 
| Alexandra Audio (lip sync)
|-
| Miraculous Ladybug: Tales of Ladybug and Chat Noir
| Чудотворната калинка: Приказки за калинката и Chat Noir
| Alexandra Audio (lip sync)
|-
| Hotel Transylvania: The Series| Хотел Трансилвания: Поредицата
| Alexandra Audio (lip sync)
|-
| align="center" colspan=3 | Upcoming programming
|-
| align="center" colspan=3 | Former programming
|-
| H2O: Just Add Water| Хаш две о
| 
|-
| Summer Days| Лятна ваканция
| Alexandra Audio (lip sync)
|- 
| Mako Mermaids 
| Русалките от Мако
| Alexandra Audio (lip sync)
|-
| Aaron Stone| Арън Стоун 
| Media Link (voice-over)
|-
| American Dragon:Jake Long| Американски дракон: Джейк Лонг
| Media Link (voice-over) 
|-
| Brandy & Mr. Whiskers| Бранди и Господин Уискърс
| Media Link (voice-over)
|-
| Hannah Montana| Хана Монтана
| Alexandra Audio (lip sync) 
|-
| JONAS| Джонас
| Dolly Media Studio (lip sync) 
|-
| Jonas LA| Джонас: Лос Анджелис
| Dolly Media Studio (lip sync) 
|-
| Kim Possible| Ким Суперплюс
| Alexandra Audio (lip sync) 
|-
| Sonny with a Chance| Съни на алеята на славата
|  Media Link (voice-over); Alexandra Audio (lip sync)
|-
| Nini| Нини
| Media Link (voice-over)
|-
| The Replacements| Смяна
| Media Link (voice-over)
|-
| The Suite Life of Zack & Cody| Лудориите на Зак и Коди
| Media Link (voice-over)
|-
| Have a Laugh!| Посмейте се!
| Alexandra Audio (lip sync)
|-
| Wizards of Waverly Place| Магьосниците от Уейвърли плейс
| Media Link (voice-over)
|-
| Zeke and Luther| Зик и Лутър
| Media Link (voice-over); Dolly Media Studio (lip sync)
|- 
| I'm in the Band| В групата съм
| Dolly Media Studio (lip sync)
|-
| The Suite Life on Deck| Корабните приключения на Зак и Коди
| Alexandra Audio (lip sync)
|-
| Kick Buttowski| Щурият Бутовски
| Alexandra Audio (lip sync)
|-
| Shake It Up| Раздвижи се
| Dolly Media Studio (lip sync)
|-
| Fish Hooks| Риби Тийнейджъри
| Dolly Media Studio (lip sync)
|-
| A.N.T. Farm| Фермата Г.О.Т.
| Dolly Media Studio (lip sync)
|-
| Kickin' It| Братя по карате
| Dolly Media Studio (lip sync)
|-
| align=center colspan=3 | Disney Junior
|-
| Mickey Mouse Clubhouse| В клуба на Мики Маус
| Alexandra Audio (lip sync)
|-
| Jake and the Never Land Pirates| Джейк и пиратите от Невърленд 
| Dolly Media Studio (lip sync)
|-
| Sofia the First 
| София Първа
| Alexandra Audio (lip sync)
|-
| Jungle Junction| Кръстовище в джунглата
| Media Link (voice-over)
|-
| Doc McStuffins| Док Макплюшинс 
| Alexandra Audio (lip sync)
|- 
| My Friends Tigger & Pooh 
| Моите приятели Тигъра и Мечо Пух 
| 
|-
| Little Einsteins 
| Айнщайнчета
| 
|-
| Handy Manny| Майстор Мани
| Dolly Media Studio (lip sync)
|-
| Special Agent Oso| Специален агент Осо
| Media Link (voice-over)
|-
| Jaden the Cat| Jaden котката
| Media Link (voice-over)
|-
| Bob the Builder| Боб строителя
| Alexandra Audio (lip sync)
|-
| Lalaloopsy| Лала смахнат
| Media Link (voice-over)
|-
| Imagination Movers| Усмихнати умници ( Сериозно?)
| Dolly Media Studio (lip sync)
|-
| LazyTown|  Мързелград
|
|- 
| align="center" colspan=3 | Other programming
|-
| Stoked| Вълнения по вълните
| Dolly Media Studio (lip sync)
|-
| H2O: Just Add Water| H2O (read as "Русалки" in bTV Comedy)
| Media Link (voice-over)
|-
| Jimmy Cool| Джими Куул
| Media Link (voice-over)
|-
| The Fairly Odd Parents| Кръстници-вълшебници
| Alexandra Audio (lip sync)
|-
| Kid vs Kat| Хлапето срещу господин Кот
| Media Link (voice-over); Dolly Media Studio (lip sync)
|-
| Monster Buster Club| Монстър Бъстър Клъб
| Media Link (voice-over)
|-
| Pokémon| Покемон
| Alexandra Audio (lip sync)
|-
| Jake & Blake| Джейк и Блейк
| Alexandra Audio (lip sync)
|-
|}

See also
 Jetix Play
 Disney XD
 Playhouse Disney
References

External links
 Disney Bulgaria on YouTube''
 Disney Channel Bulgaria website
 TeleManiac Disney Channel forum  (in Bulgarian)

Bulgaria
Television networks in Bulgaria
Bulgarian-language television stations
Children's television networks
Television channels and stations established in 1999
1999 establishments in Bulgaria
2009 establishments in Bulgaria

ru:Disney Channel Bulgaria